Emanuel Weaver III (born June 28, 1960) is a former American football nose tackle in the National Football League for the Cincinnati Bengals and Atlanta Falcons. He also was a member of the New Jersey Generals in the United States Football League. He played college football at South Carolina University.

Early years
Weaver attended John McDonogh High School, where he was a defensive tackle. He accepted a football scholarship from South Carolina University. He injured his knee late in his senior season.

Professional career
Weaver was selected by the Cincinnati Bengals in the second round (54th overal) of the 1982 NFL Draft. He was placed on the injured reserve list on August 29, 1983. He was waived on August 28, 1984.

On December 27, 1984, he signed with the New Jersey Generals of the United States Football League. He appeared in 12 games during the 1985 season. He played with the team until the league folded in 1986.

In 1987, he was signed as a free agent by the New Orleans Saints. He was released on August 27.

After the NFLPA strike was declared on the third week of the 1987 season, those contests were canceled (reducing the 16 game season to 15) and the NFL decided that the games would be played with replacement players. In September, he was signed by the Atlanta Falcons to be a part of their replacement team. He appeared in 2 games and was released at the end of the strike on October 19.

References

External links
Emanuel Weaver Stats

1960 births
Living people
Players of American football from New Orleans
American football defensive tackles
South Carolina State Bulldogs football players
Cincinnati Bengals players
New Jersey Generals players
Atlanta Falcons players
National Football League replacement players